Corrado Maddii (born 28 March 1957) is an Italian former professional motocross racer and current motocross team manager. He competed in the Motocross World Championships from 1976 to 1990. Maddii was a two-time vice world champion in the 125cc class.

Motorcycle racing career
Maddii was born in Levane in the province of Arezzo. He began competing in motocross racing in 1973 and by 1976 had advanced to the motocross world championships riding a Moto Aspes. Maddii joined the Aprilia factory racing team in 1979 and finished fifth in the 125cc world championship. After three years with the Aprilia team, he switched to ride for the Gilera factory racing team in 1980 and finished second to Eric Geboers in the 125cc world championship. 

After only one season with Gilera, Maddii joined the Cagiva factory racing team in 1981. In 1984, Maddii had accumulated a sizable lead in the 125cc world championship points standings going into the final race of the season however, he suffered a broken leg in practice allowing Michele Rinaldi to claim the world championship by just 3 points as, Maddii was once again relegated to vice champion.

References

External links
 Maddii Racing Team Web Site
 

Living people
1957 births
Sportspeople from the Province of Arezzo
Italian motocross riders